Devan Ramachandran (born 19 March 1968) is an Indian Judge. Presently, he is Judge of Kerala High Court. The High Court of Kerala is the highest court of Judicature for the State of Kerala and Union Territory of Lakshadweep.

Early life and education 
Devan Ramachandran completed his schooling from Bhavans Vidya Mandir, Elamakkara, pre-degree from the Sacred Heart College, Thevara and obtained law degree from Government Law College, Ernakulam.

Career 
He started practicing as an advocate in 1991, under the guidance of his father Senior Advocate Mr. M.P.R. Nair, Barrister-in-Law (Middle Temple- London). He practiced in various modern branches of law including corporate, company and constitutional matters. In recognition of his eminence, the Kerala High Court had engaged services of Sri Devan Ramachandran to be its advocate/counsel when he was just 35 years, making him the youngest one to do so till date. Justice Ramachandran also served as standing counsel for the CBSE, various private and public companies, various banking and financial institutions, including the Indian Banks' Association, the principal financial advisory mechanism to Reserve Bank of India.

Achievements 
He was designated as a 'Senior Advocate' by the High Court of Kerala, in 2015. Justice Devan Ramachandran and his father are credited to be the first; and until now, the only father-son duo to be designated as 'Senior Advocates' by the High Court of Kerala.

The High Court of Kerala had also appointed Justice Devan, while he was a Counsel, to assist as an Amicus Curiae (friend of court) in a suo motu Public Interest Litigation pertaining to the illegal trafficking of children from North India to Kerala.

The Indian Express recognised Justice Devan Ramachandran as a newsmaker in 2019 for his judgments that impacted public life.

Notable cases 

Very recently, Justice Devan Ramachandran was called upon by young girl students to decide if the “curfew” imposed on them to leave and enter their hostels were justified. Justice Ramachandran, in a landmark judgment held that “no gate, no lock, no bolt, can set upon the freedom of the kind of a girl” and ordered relaxation of the timings of all student hostels in Kerala.

In another significant judgment, Justice Devan Ramachandran has declared the use of disrespectful and abusive words and vocatives by Police against citizens to be “relics of the colonial subjugatory tactics” and hence unconstitutional. The State Police Chief has now issued a circular to all officers not to use disrespectful words like “eda”, “podi” and “nee” to address citizens. He had also, in the year 2018, delivered another judgment directing the State Police Chief to ensure that the Police Force behaves as a modern, civilized and professional force.

In a move to make Kerala an investor friendly destination, Justice Ramachandran has held the long continuing ill practice of Trade Unions to extort money as gawking charges (called “nokkukooli” in Malayalam) illegal.

In the recent times, Justice Devan Ramachandran and Justice Kauser Edapagath took up several important issues with respect to the COVID 19 pandemic.The most important was to control the COVID treatment costs in private hospitals.

In 2020, a notable order authored by Justice Ramachandran relating to a controversial contract granted by the Government of Kerala to an American company called "Sprinklr" for processing the data of patients and persons suspected of COVID-19 in Kerala. Through the order, Justice Ramachandran, sitting with Justice Ravi, directed the Government to anonymise the entire data before it is handed over to Sprinklr for processing; further injuncting Sprinklr from committing any breach of confidentiality or dealing with the data against the terms of the confidentiality clauses in the agreement. The Columbia University Journal has hailed this order to be "extra ordinary" from the angle of data protection.

The condition of bad roads and flooding in Kochi City and other parts of Kerala has been engaging the High Court through Justice Ramachandran. However, in the meanwhile a young person died in a pothole and Justice Ramachandran took note of it suo Motu and issued urgent directions, at the same time apologising to the victim's family for the systemic failure that led to the accident.
 
Reacting to the death of a pedestrian by electrocution from a snapped overhead line on a public street, Justice Devan initiated a suo motu case against the Electricity Board and issued directions to it to avert such in future.

Justice Ramachandran has been writing judgments on the need for protection and conservation of environment, ecology and nature. He has, sitting in Division, banned the use of plastics at the Sabarimala Hills and shrine, including in the "irumudikettu", the traditional offering carried by pilgrims. This judgment has now forced Government of Kerala to ban single-use plastics in the whole of Kerala.

Again, Justice Devan Ramachandran, reacting to the horrific damage being caused to ecology by what is commonly called the "Flex Boards" found carelessly placed all over public spaces in Kerala, ordered strict legal regulation of installation and erection of unauthorised Flex boards/ Advertisement Boards/ Billboards / Flags in any public space all over Kerala. This case is still pending and several further orders have been issued, under the concept of continuing mandamus, to ensure that such boards are implicitly regulated as per law. As a direct impact of these orders, the Government of Kerala has issued an order banning "Flex Boards" in the state.

Justice Devan, evolving a new principle termed "Lost Life", ordered payment as special compensation to be paid to the mother of a minor victim of a motor accident who had been reduced to a permanent vegetative state pursuant to the accident and has remained as such for the past 13 years.

Justice Devan Ramachandran ruled, again in a first of its kind judgment, in November 2017, that a minister whilst he is holding such a position cannot file a case against one's own government or its functionaries. The judgment was rendered in case filed by Sri Thomas Chandy, an erstwhile minister in the State of Kerala. The judgment touches upon the aspects of 'Cabinet Confidentiality' and 'Cabinet Solidarity'.

Through a judgment delivered in October 2017, in T.M. Thomas v State of Kerala, Justice Devan had called for mechanism ensuring active participation of victims in criminal proceedings along with the State, rather than being a mere outsider to such proceedings. The Director General of Police, in compliance with the above judgment has subsequently issued a circular to honor in letter and spirit the terms of the said judgment.

Justice Devan upholding the autonomy and independence of Universities held that they are not subservient to any Government.

Describing the long human chain formation (queue) in front of liquor shops across the state as an "affront to the dignity of citizenry and loss of self respect", Justice Ramachandran, issued various directions to the State Excise Department to do away with such a practice with consideration for self respect and upholding humanitarian values.

In a judgment delivered in 2016, Justice Devan Ramachandran, expressed deep anguish and concern over the deteriorating status of Legal education across the country. Justice Devan, who penned the judgment sitting in Division Bench, directed that the legal education imparted across the country should be done with a trajectory (vision) towards the future.

References

External links 
High Court of Kerala - Judges

Living people
1968 births
Judges of the Kerala High Court